Won W. Lee is a professor of religion and Asian studies and Department Chair at Calvin University in Grand Rapids, Michigan.

Life 
Lee holds a BA from Yonsei University, Korea, a M.Div from the Princeton Theological Seminary, and from 1998 a PhD from the Claremont Graduate School,  He is a member of Society of Biblical Literature, The Society for Old Testament Study and Korean Biblical Colloquium.

Contributions 
W. W. Lee deepen a study in the book of Numbers. According to Bruce Wells, "Lee argues that in the book of Numbers, the passage 10:11-36:16 constitutes an unified and coherent literary unit." Christian Frevel calls the study of W. W. Lee as "the famous compositional analysis." Mark J. Boda affirm that this "kind of dissertation that makes a splendid book, with its sustained argumentation, focus on interpretation of a large portion o text in the biblical corpus, and limited (but careful) review of past scholarship."

Works

References 

Living people
Calvin University faculty
Yonsei University alumni
Princeton Theological Seminary alumni
Claremont Graduate University alumni
Year of birth missing (living people)